Azumamorula mutica, common name the smooth ricinula, is a species of sea snail, a marine gastropod mollusk in the family Muricidae, the murex snails or rock snails. It is the only species in genus Azumamorula.

Description
The shell size varies between 15 mm and 20 mm

Distribution
This species is distributed in the Indian Ocean along Madagascar, the Mascarene basin, Réunion, and along Eastern Australia.

Taxonomy
This species was originally named Ricinula mutica by Lamarck in 1816, grouping it with species that are now mostly in Drupa and Morula.  In 1823, Dall defined two new genera, Drupina and Morulina, to hold species of Drupa and Morula having simple non-plaited columnellae.  He chose R. mutica as the type species for Morulina.

Thiele in 1931 and Wenz in 1941 had placed Morulina into Drupa.  In 1968, Emerson found that the teeth on the radula of D. mutica had an unusual shape.  As a result, he desired to split it out to its own genus, but the name Morulina was already taken as a genus of arthropod.  Thus he introduced a new name Azumamorula, recognising Masao Azuma who had extracted the radula specimen.

In 2004, Houart placed Azumamorula and Oppomorus as subgenera of Morula, and moved Morula from subfamily Rapaninae to Ergalataxinae. However, in 2013, a phylogenetic study of the sequences for four genes indicated that Morula (Morula) sensu stricto was polyphyletic, and Morula (Oppomorus) was a separate clade. The relevant genes from A. mutica haven't been sequenced, but it's unlikely to be part of a more-restricted Morula–Habromorula group.  As of 2020, Houart lists Azumamorula as a separate genus and Molluscabase classes the combination Azumamorula mutica as "accepted".

Notes

References

 Lamarck, J.B.P.A. de M. 1816. Liste des objets représentés dans les planches de cette livraison. pp. 1–16 in Lamarck, J.B.P.A. de M. Tableau encyclopédique et méthodique des trois règnes de la nature. Vers, coquilles, mollusques et polypiers. Paris : Agasse Part 23 pp. 1–16, pls 391–488.
 Reeve, L.A. 1846. Monograph of the genus Ricinula. pls 1–6 in Reeve, L.A. (ed). Conchologia Iconica. London : L. Reeve & Co. Vol. 3.
 Dautzenberg, Ph. (1929). Mollusques testacés marins de Madagascar. Faune des Colonies Francaises, Tome III
 Drivas, J. & M. Jay (1988). Coquillages de La Réunion et de l'île Maurice
 Wilson, B. 1994. Australian Marine Shells. Prosobranch Gastropods. Kallaroo, WA : Odyssey Publishing Vol. 2 370 pp.

External links

 
 Illustration of Ricinula shells plate 395, legend page 169.  "Ricinula mutica Lamk. VII. 233." is figure 2.  Lamarck (1816) part 23 of Tableau encyclopédique et méthodique des trois règnes de la nature. Contenant l'helminthologie, ou les vers infusoires, les vers intestins, les vers mollusques, &c.; Paris. Plate is notated "Deseve dir't", probably Jacques Eustache de Sève, son of Jacques de Sève.
 Description by Lamarck in Latin and French, 1822. Histoire naturelle des animaux sans vertèbres t. 7 p. 233. BHL, from holdings at  Uni. Toronto, Smithsonian. 
 Reprint of Lamarck's 1816 "Liste des objets". Richard E. Petit, 2011, Conchologia Ingrata issue 3. 
 Illustration (plate II, fig. 6) by Sowerby in Reeve's Conchologica Iconica (1845). 
 Illustration (fig. 2, as Purpura pisolina) in 

Ergalataxinae
Gastropods described in 1816